Onyema is a surname. Notable people with the surname include:

Allen Onyema (born 1964), Nigerian entrepreneur
Elvis Onyema (born 1986), Nigerian football player
Oscar N. Onyema (born 1968), Nigerian financier
His Royal Majesty Eze V. B. C. Onyema III (born 1927), Nigerian monarch

Surnames of Nigerian origin